Hoverwing can refer to several innovative flying machines / concepts:
 The Hoverwing (rc), a small radio-controlled aircraft under development in Britain
 The Fischer Flugmechanik Hoverwing (FF), an experimental German Ground effect vehicle
 The Universal Hovercraft Hoverwing (UH) ground effect light hovercraft